Ídolos may refer to:

Ídolos (Brazilian TV series)
Ídolos (Portuguese TV series)
 Idols (film) (Spanish: Ídolos), 1943

See also
Idol (disambiguation)